Soba is a type of Japanese buckwheat noodle.

Soba or SOBA may also refer to:

Places
Soba (city), capital of the Nubian kingdom of Alodia, now in Sudan
Soba, Angola, in Vila Estoril, Belas, Luanda province
Soba, Cantabria, Spain
Soba, Korhogo, a neighbourhood of the city of Korhogo, Savanes District, Ivory Coast
Soba, Nigeria, city in Nigeria
Soba, Woroba, a village in Woroba District, Ivory Coast
Ṣōbā,  transliterated Syriac name of Nisibis, now Nusaybin, a city in Turkey

Entertainment
Soba (film), a 2004 film directed by Mexican filmmaker Alan Coton
Sounds of Blackness Award (S.O.B.A or SOBA), an annual Canadian awards in hip hop and urban music

See also
 Zobah, the capital of an early Aramean state in southern Syria
 Sobat (disambiguation)